Neil Kannas Wagner (born January 1, 1984) is an American former professional baseball pitcher. He played in Major League Baseball (MLB) for the Oakland Athletics and Toronto Blue Jays and in Nippon Professional Baseball for the Saitama Seibu Lions.

Amateur career
Wagner attended Eden Prairie High School in Eden Prairie, Minnesota. He enrolled at North Dakota State University, where he played college baseball for the North Dakota State Bison and studied biology and chemistry. He left before graduating.

Professional career

Cleveland Indians
The Cleveland Indians selected Wagner in the 21st round of the 2005 Major League Baseball draft.

Oakland Athletics
On May 14, 2010, he was traded to the Oakland Athletics for cash considerations. He was promoted to the majors for the first time by the Athletics on August 30, 2011.

San Diego Padres
On May 28, 2012, Wagner was waived by the Athletics and claimed by the San Diego Padres.  Wagner spent most of 2012 with the Triple-A Tucson Padres. He was designated for assignment on August 23, and became a free agent on November 3.

Toronto Blue Jays
On November 15, 2012, the Toronto Blue Jays signed Wagner to a minor league contract with an invitation to Spring Training. The deal was announced by the Jays on November 21, 2012.

Wagner began the 2013 season with the Triple-A Buffalo Bisons. He was called up by the Toronto Blue Jays on May 29. Wagner recorded his first career win in a game on June 7 against the Texas Rangers, pitching 1 innings in relief. After posting a 2–3 record with a 3.26 ERA and 16 strikeouts in 20 appearances, Wagner was optioned to Triple-A Buffalo on July 21 to make room on the 25-man roster for Melky Cabrera's return from the disabled list. Wagner was recalled when Cabrera went on the disabled list on August 2, 2013.

The Blue Jays optioned Wagner to the Buffalo Bisons on March 14, 2014. He was recalled by the Blue Jays on April 9, 2014, and sent back to Buffalo on April 26. After a consultation with Dr. James Andrews on August 12, 2014, it was determined that Wagner would require Tommy John surgery and was expected to miss the rest of the 2014 season as well as the entire 2015 season. He was designated for assignment on September 1, 2014. The following day, Wagner was released.

Tampa Bay Rays
On September 12, Wagner signed a two-year minor league contract with the Tampa Bay Rays, that included an invitation to 2016 spring training. He was released on August 2, 2017.

New York Mets
On August 15, 2017, Wagner signed a minor league contract with the New York Mets.

Saitama Seibu Lions
He elected free agency on November 6, 2017, and signed with the Saitama Seibu Lions of Nippon Professional Baseball (NPB) on December 13. He was placed on waivers on September 28, 2018.

References

External links

1984 births
Living people
Akron Aeros players
American expatriate baseball players in Japan
American expatriate baseball players in Canada
Baseball players from Minnesota
Buffalo Bisons (minor league) players
Charlotte Stone Crabs players
Durham Bulls players
Gulf Coast Blue Jays players
Kinston Indians players
Lake County Captains players
Las Vegas 51s players
Mahoning Valley Scrappers players
Major League Baseball pitchers
Midland RockHounds players
Nippon Professional Baseball pitchers
North Dakota State Bison baseball players
Oakland Athletics players
Sacramento River Cats players
Saitama Seibu Lions players
Surprise Rafters players
Toronto Blue Jays players
Tucson Padres players
West Oahu Canefires players
Mankato MoonDogs players